The Soroti–Dokolo–Lira Road is a road in Uganda, connecting the towns of Soroti in Soroti District, Dokolo in Dokolo District, and Lira in Lira District.

Location
The road starts at Soroti (population 49,452), the largest town in Teso sub-region, Eastern Region of Uganda. It continues in a northwesterly direction, through Dokolo in Dokolo District, Lango sub-region, Northern Region, to end at Lira, in Lira District, a total distance of about
. The coordinates of the road near Dokolo are 1°55'23.0"N, 33°09'28.0"E (Latitude:1.923056; Longitude:33.157778).

Upgrading to bitumen
In 2007, partly financed with a loan from the World Bank Group, the government of Uganda began improving the surface of this road to class II bitumen, with shoulders and drainage channels. Upgrading of the  Soroti-Dokolo section began in May 2007. Work on the  Dokolo-Lira section began a month later. The construction contract was awarded to China Roads and Bridge Corporation. The road works were completed four months ahead of schedule in 2010. The total construction bill for the project was USh:153.1 billion, with the  Soroti–Dokolo section costing USh:70.5 billion and the  Dokolo–Lira section billed at USh:82.6 billion.

See also
 List of roads in Uganda
 Economy of Uganda
 Transport in Uganda
 Uganda National Roads Authority

References

External links
 Uganda National Road Authority Homepage
 The 5th Annual Joint Transportation Review: Uganda National Roads Authority - 27 October 2009  
 Regional Imbalance: The Story of Road Construction In Uganda

Roads in Uganda
Lira District
Dokolo District
Kaberamaido District
Soroti District
Lango sub-region
Teso sub-region
Northern Region, Uganda
Eastern Region, Uganda